André Oliveira de Lima  (born 20 April 1985), known as  André Oliveira or André Beleza, is a Brazilian footballer who plays as an attacking midfielder.

He moved to 2. Bundesliga side 1. FC Köln after Iraty sold him to the German club on 3 January 2007.

References

External links

1985 births
Living people
People from Natal, Rio Grande do Norte
Brazilian footballers
Association football midfielders
Association football forwards
Campeonato Brasileiro Série A players
Campeonato Brasileiro Série C players
Campeonato Brasileiro Série D players
2. Bundesliga players
Santos FC players
Iraty Sport Club players
Ceará Sporting Club players
ABC Futebol Clube players
América Futebol Clube (RN) players
Associação Olímpica de Itabaiana players
Sampaio Corrêa Futebol Clube players
Goianésia Esporte Clube players
Treze Futebol Clube players
Associação Portuguesa de Desportos players
1. FC Köln players
Santos Futebol Clube (AP) players
Brazilian expatriate footballers
Brazilian expatriate sportspeople in Germany
Expatriate footballers in Germany
Sportspeople from Rio Grande do Norte